Terence Smith may refer to:

Terence Smith (journalist) (born 1938), American journalist
Terence Smith (sailor) (1932–2021), British sailor
Terence Smith (soccer) (born 1991), Canadian soccer player

See also
Terry Smith (disambiguation)